Parveen or Parvin or  Perveen or Pervin or Parween is a Persian-origin name meaning Pleiades.

People

Females
Parvin Ahmadinejad (born 1962), Iranian politician
Parvin Ardalan (born 1967), Iranian women's rights activist, writer and journalist
Parveen Babi (1954 –2005), Indian actress
Pervin Buldan (born 1967), Turkish politician
Parvin Darabi (born 1941), Iranian born American activist, writer and defender of women's rights
Parvin Dowlatabadi (1924–2008), Iranian children's author and poet
Parvin E'tesami (1907–1941), Iranian poet
Parween Hayat, Pakistani politician
Shama Parveen Magsi (born 1950), politician from Balochistan province of Pakistan
Pervin Özdemir (born 1951), Turkish ceramic artist
Selina Parvin (1931–1971), Bangladeshi journalist
Parween Pazhwak (born 1967), Afghan artist and poet and writer in the Persian language
Parveen Shakir (1952–1994) Pakistani Urdu poet, teacher and civil servant
Parvin Soleimani (1922–2009), Iranian actress of theater and cinema
Parveen Sultana (born 1950), Indian Hindustani classical singer

Males
Parvin Dabas (born 1974), Indian actor and model
Parvin Darabadi, professor at the International Relations Department, Baku State University
Parvin Mammadov, Azerbaijani Paralympic powerlifter
Alfred Parvin (1859–1916), English cricketer
Ali Parvin (born 1947), Iranian football player
Landon Parvin (born 1948), American political speech
Parveen Kumar Saini (born 1987), Indian Chartered accountant

Places
Parvin Bridge, Lane County, Oregon, US
Parvin State Park, New Jersey, US

Other uses
PARVA gene, encodes the protein alpha-parvin in humans 
Parvin (mango), mango

Persian unisex given names
Pakistani feminine given names